EP 09 Towers is a complex of six towers spreading across a built-up area of 450,000 square meters. The mixed-use community will have one residential community and the other two which include retail, commercial, and entertainment amenities. All these towers will be connected at the base, but separated above by a distance spanning 175 meters. The energy-efficient buildings will open up to landscaped roof, garden and podium. The energy save by one tower could be passed on the other, and hence the buildings will complement the use of energy.

See also
Jumeirah Garden City
1 Dubai
Meraas Tower
1 Park Avenue
 List of buildings in Dubai

References
EP towers complex
EP 09 Tower 1
EP 09 Tower 2
EP 09 Tower 3
EP 09 Tower 4
EP 09 Tower 5
EP 09 Tower 6

Proposed skyscrapers in Dubai